Wai Lae Hmway Kyway Lae Hmway, is a 1994 Burmese military- drama film starring Kyaw Hein, Dwe, Myint Myint Khine and Tint Tint Tun. Kyaw Hein won the Best Supporting Actor Award in 1994 Myanmar Motion Picture Academy Awards for this film.

Cast
Kyaw Hein as Sergeant Phoe Si, father of Captain Ye Min Aung
Dwe as Captain Ye Min Aung
Myint Myint Khine as Mi Aye, mother of Captain Ye Min Aung
Tint Tint Tun as Ma Ma Soe

References

1994 films
1990s Burmese-language films
Burmese drama films
Films shot in Myanmar
1994 drama films